William Pettigrew Gibson (3 January 1902 - 22 April 1960) was a Scottish-born art historian and art gallery curator. He worked as Assistant Keeper of the Wallace Collection, London, from 1927, was Reader in the History of Art at the University of London and Deputy Director of the Courtauld Institute of Art from 1936, and Keeper of the National Gallery from 1939 to 1960.

Early life and education 
His father was Edwin Arthur Gibson (1870-1946), a physician, and his mother was Ellen Shaw Gibson (née Pettigrew, 1869-1945). He had an elder sister, Margaret Ellen Gibson (1900-1964) and a younger brother, James Arthur Walker Gibson (1903-1968). He was educated at Westminster School, London, then studied natural sciences and physiology at Christ Church College, Oxford, graduating with a BSc in 1924.

Professional work 
Although Gibson had originally planned to go into medicine like his father, he became interested in art history through an Oxford friend, the archaeologist Humfry Payne, who later directed the British School at Athens. He was appointed Assistant Keeper and lecturer at the Wallace Collection in 1927. In 1936 he became a Reader in the History of Art at the University of London, and in the same year was appointed Deputy Director of the Courtauld Institute of Art. He became acquainted with Kenneth Clark, Director of the National Gallery, who appointed him Keeper of the National Gallery in 1939. Gibson specialised in 18th century French art. During the Second World War he spent long periods on firewatch duty, day and night, at the National Gallery, although the art collection itself had been moved away from London for safekeeping.

Publications

Books

Articles

Family 
Gibson married Christina Pamela Ogilvy in 1940.  In the late 1940s they moved to Wyddial Hall, a 16th century country house in East Hertfordshire, which became a Grade II* listed building in October 1951. They lived a simple life there without a telephone or radio. Gibson died unexpectedly at the age of 58, on 22 April 1960, at University College Hospital, London. His obituary appeared in The Times on 23 April 1960 (p. 8).

References 

1902 births
1960 deaths
British art historians
British art curators
Alumni of Christ Church, Oxford
Academics of the Courtauld Institute of Art
People associated with the Wallace Collection
People associated with the National Gallery, London
Westminster School